The Spore is Opiate for the Masses's second full-length album,  released on April 26, 2005, by Jim Kaufman's own Voodoo Records. The CD is sold with a Warcon DVD including videos from Opiate for the Masses, Eighteen Visions, Queens of the Stone Age, Drowning Pool, El Pus, Stutterfly and Bleed The Dream. There is also a collection of movie trailers, concert clips, video game teasers and a five-track demo by Shadows Fall.

Track listing
 "Introduction"
 "Can't Feel"
 "Up To Me"
 "Drown"
 "Clean"
 "Step Up"
 "Intermission"
 "Heaven"
 "Now"
 "Transparency"
 "Dig It Up"
 "Interlude #2"
 "Nothing Left"
 "The End"

References

Opiate for the Masses albums
2005 albums